Ryang Yong-gi (born 7 January 1982) is a Japanese-born North Korean footballer who plays for Vegalta Sendai in the J2 League.

Ryang is captain of his club where he is a creative midfielder.

Ryang has made one appearance for the Korea DPR national football team in the 2010 FIFA World Cup qualifying rounds  and was named as one of the North Korean squad for the 2010 AFC Challenge Cup. Ryang won the Golden Boot and Most Valuable Player awards at the competition that guided Korea DPR to win the title and qualify for 2011 AFC Asian Cup.

2011 Tōhoku earthquake and tsunami

During the 2011 Tōhoku earthquake and tsunami, Ryang was out driving when it hit. "I thought my tires had gone flat or I had driven over the curb, but the shaking continued and I saw the windows of shops shaking too," he recalled. "I knew it was a bad one and rushed home to see my wife." Ryang and his heavily pregnant wife spent the night sleeping in their car, fearful of further damage to buildings in an urban landscape that suffered severe wreckage.

In the aftermath of the disaster, Ryang and his teammates made frequent visits to affected areas to lend support.

Career statistics

Club

International

International goals

Scores and results list North Korea's goal tally first, score column indicates score after each Ryang goal.

Honours
Vegalta Sendai
J. League Division 2 - 2009
North Korea
2010 AFC Challenge Cup
Individual
Individual Fair-Play award - 2011
Monthly Best Goal - 2015

References

External links

 
 
 

1982 births
Living people
Hannan University alumni
Association football people from Osaka Prefecture
North Korean footballers
North Korea international footballers
Japanese footballers
Japanese people of North Korean descent
J1 League players
J2 League players
Vegalta Sendai players
Sagan Tosu players
2011 AFC Asian Cup players
2015 AFC Asian Cup players
Expatriate footballers in Japan
Association football midfielders
Zainichi Korean people
People from Tadaoka, Osaka